The enzyme CDP-glucose 4,6-dehydratase catalyzes the chemical reaction

CDP-glucose  CDP-4-dehydro-6-deoxy-D-glucose + H2O

This enzyme belongs to the family of lyases, specifically the hydro-lyases, which cleave carbon-oxygen bonds.  This enzyme participates in starch and sucrose metabolism.  It employs one cofactor, NAD+.

Nomenclature 
The systematic name of this enzyme class is CDP-glucose 4,6-hydro-lyase (CDP-4-dehydro-6-deoxy-D-glucose-forming). Other names in common use include:
  cytidine diphosphoglucose oxidoreductase, and 
 CDP-glucose 4,6-hydro-lyase.

Structural studies

References

 
 
 

EC 4.2.1
NADH-dependent enzymes
Enzymes of known structure